Innherreds Avis (The Innherred Gazette) was a Norwegian newspaper published in Steinkjer from December 2, 1933 to June 26, 1934. The editor for this entire period was Reidar Stavseth.

References

Defunct newspapers published in Norway
Norwegian-language newspapers
Mass media in Trøndelag
Publications established in 1933
Publications disestablished in 1934